The Antigua and Barbuda national under-20 football team represents Antigua and Barbuda in international football at this age level and is controlled by the Antigua and Barbuda Football Association.

Current squad 
 The following players were called up for the 2022 CONCACAF U-20 Championship.
 Match dates: 18 June – 3 July 2022
 Caps and goals correct as of: 19 June 2022, after the match against 
 Names in italics denote players who have been capped for the senior team.

FIFA U-20 World Cup Record

References

External links
 Official Site
  Antigua Sun

Under-20
Caribbean national under-20 association football teams